Patrice Fisher (born January 5, 1978) is an American actress best known for her lead role as Patience James in the Cinemax TV series Zane's Sex Chronicles.

Career 

Originally from Del Rio, Texas, born January 5, 1978, Patrice Fisher was raised in a military family. At a young age she decided she wanted to be an entertainer. She moved to Los Angeles to model but soon discovered her love of acting, and picked up her first role as one of the prostitutes in the movie How High, featuring rappers Method Man and Redman. Fisher appears on the Cinemax TV series Zane's Sex Chronicles as the lead character Patience James. She has also guest starred on the TV series Boston Public; Yes, Dear; CSI and a recurring role in the TV series Charmed as the character Avatar Beta. She appears in the music video for Avant's single "4 Minutes".

Filmography

Film and TV Movies

Television

Video Games

References

External links

Official Site

1978 births
American film actresses
Living people
People from Del Rio, Texas
African-American actresses
American television actresses
21st-century African-American people
21st-century African-American women
20th-century African-American people
20th-century African-American women